John B. S. Coats or JBS Coats (8 July 1906 in Ayr, South Ayrshire, Scotland – 26 December 1979) was a theosophist, president of the Theosophical Society Adyar and bishop of the Liberal Catholic Church.

In 1932 he became a member of the T.S. in London. There he met Alice Bailey, C. Jinarajadasa, Rukmini Devi Arundale and George Arundale. In 1973 he became president of the T.S. Adyar.

External links
 Bio 
 Sundrum Castle 
 Geschichte des Familienunternehmens Coats (German)
 https://www.ts-adyar.org/content/john-b-s-coats-1906-1979

Scottish Theosophists
1906 births
1979 deaths